Squire Whipple (September 16, 1804 – March 15, 1888) was an American civil engineer.

Biography
Squire Whipple was born in Hardwick, Massachusetts on September 16, 1804. His family moved to New York when he was thirteen. He received his secondary education at the Fairfield Academy in Herkimer, New York, and graduated from Union College in New York after only one year. He has become known as the father of iron bridge building in America.

He died March 15, 1888, at his home in Albany, New York, US and was buried in Albany Rural Cemetery, Menands, New York.

Bridges

Constructed by S. DeGraff of Syracuse, New York, 1867–69, the Whipple Cast and Wrought Iron Bowstring Truss Bridge over Norman's Kill in Albany, New York, is a very well preserved example of a Whipple Bowstring Arch Truss, still in daily use, with no posted weight limits. Due to the sleek appearance, many users think it is a modern bridge. (The Delaware Turnpike once ran through both neighborhoods until 1929 with the construction of a new much higher, longer, and wider Delaware Avenue Bridge over the Normans Kill. This allowed commuters to and from Albany to bypass both Normansvilles. The original Whipple Bowstring bridge still stands, though it has been closed to vehicular traffic since January 1990.)
His patented designs were implemented in numerous bridges, both Whipple truss and prefabricated bowstring arch truss bridges, which became the standard design for Erie Canal crossings; using an economical mix of wrought iron for tension members and cast iron in compression. Another such arch is the Shaw Bridge, the only known Whipple bowstring at its original location and the only known "double" believed extant, "a structure of outstanding importance to the history of American engineering and transportation technology." There are at least four other Whipple bowstrings standing in Central New York state, and one in Newark, Ohio.

Patents

  – Bowstring iron-bridge truss (1841)
  – Lift draw bridge

Books
A Work on Bridge-Building: Consisting of Two Essays, the One Elementary and General, the Other Giving Original Plans, and Practical Details, for Iron and Wooden Bridges (1847)
An elementary and practical treatise on bridge building (1899)

References

External links
 Genealogy Squire Whipple, Whipple.org
 Squire Whipple essay, Whipple.org
 ASCE – History and Heritage of Civil Engineering
 
 Survey number HAER NY-4 – Whipple Cast & Wrought Iron Bowstring Truss Bridge, Normans Kill Vicinity, Albany, Albany County, NY (Biography on page 3)
 Photo of an all-wood Whipple bowstring arch truss bridge built in 1882 in Santa Cruz, California (Santa Cruz Public Library collection)

1804 births
1888 deaths
American bridge engineers
American civil engineers
People from Albany, New York
People from Hardwick, Massachusetts
Union College (New York) alumni
Burials at Albany Rural Cemetery
Engineers from New York (state)